Economic oppression is the social act of placing severe economic restrictions on  individuals, groups or institutions. Economic oppression may take several forms, including the practice of bonded labour (in some parts of India); serfdom; forced labour; low wages; denial of equal opportunity; practicing employment discrimination; and economic discrimination based on sex, gender, nationality, race, and religion. 

The term economic oppression is sometimes misunderstood in the sense of economic sanction, embargo or economic boycott which each have different significances. The contextual application and significance of the term economic oppression has been changing over a period of time.

See also
Class discrimination
Wage slavery

References

Economic problems
Injustice